Dakota Mills (born 3 June 1997) is an American-born Saint Kitts and Nevis footballer who plays as a centre back for the Saint Kitts and Nevis women's national team.

Career
Mills played for the Hightstown Rams in high school, where she was an All-American nominee and an All-State honoree. She also participated in track and field, and was selected as the school's athlete of the year. On the club level, she played for FC Bucks Fury. In college, she played for the Saint Joseph's Hawks from 2015 to 2019. She was included in the Atlantic 10 Conference All-Rookie team as a freshman in 2015. She was selected as an ECAC All-Star and Offensive Player of the Year in 2016, and was included in the NSCAA Mid-Atlantic All-Region second team in 2016. Mills was also named the Atlantic 10 Offensive Player of the Year in 2016, and was included in the Atlantic 10 All-Championship team in 2016, as well as the Atlantic 10 All-Conference first team in 2016 and 2018. She holds the school record for most goals in a season (18 in 2016) and most points in a season (tally of goals and assists, 41 in 2016). In total, she made 80 appearances, scoring 39 goals and recording 11 assists, ranking second in school history for goals and points (89).

Mills has appeared for the Saint Kitts and Nevis women's national team, including in the 2020 CONCACAF Women's Olympic Qualifying Championship against Canada on 29 January 2020.

Personal life
Mills is a native of East Windsor Township, New Jersey, and majored in business at Saint Joseph's University.

References

External links
 

1997 births
Living people
Citizens of Saint Kitts and Nevis through descent
Saint Kitts and Nevis women's footballers
Women's association football central defenders
Women's association football forwards
Saint Kitts and Nevis women's international footballers
Hightstown High School alumni
People from East Windsor, New Jersey
Sportspeople from Mercer County, New Jersey
Soccer players from New Jersey
American women's soccer players
Saint Joseph's Hawks women's soccer players
African-American women's soccer players
American people of Saint Kitts and Nevis descent
21st-century African-American sportspeople
21st-century African-American women